Nikolai Schamov (born 22 August 1936) was a Soviet ski jumper who competed from the late 1950s to the mid-1960s. He won the 1956-7 Four Hills Tournament event at Innsbruck. He also competed at the 1956 Winter Olympics, the 1960 Winter Olympics and the 1964 Winter Olympics.

References

External links

1936 births
Living people
Skiers from Moscow
Soviet male ski jumpers
Olympic ski jumpers of the Soviet Union
Ski jumpers at the 1956 Winter Olympics
Ski jumpers at the 1960 Winter Olympics
Ski jumpers at the 1964 Winter Olympics